Al Ahdath Al Maghribia is a daily Moroccan tabloid.

History and profile
Al Ahdath Al Maghribia was established by Mohammad Brini and other socialist dissidents in 1999. The publisher is Entreprise Maghrebine de Médias.

The newspaper's editor is Mokhtar Laghzioui and it is headquartered in Casablanca.

Although the paper has an independent socialist political leaning, it is close to the Socialist Union of Popular Forces. The paper is based in Casablanca.

As of June 2012 Mokhtar Laghzioui was the editor-in-chief of the daily.

The newspaper is controversial for pioneering many genres of stories not pursued before by other newspapers.  It is both high and low brow, offering articles on both philosophy and personal advise columns.  It has a sensational style and has been threatened by some for violating social norms.

The 2003 circulation of the paper was 80,000 copies, making it the most read newspaper in the country.

References

External links
 Al Ahdath website 
 Presse Maroc - جريدة إلكترونية مغربية

1999 establishments in Morocco
Publications established in 1999
Newspapers published in Morocco
Arabic-language newspapers
Mass media in Casablanca